Ronald Alan George (born August 30, 1953) is a former Republican member of the Maryland House of Delegates. From January 2007 to January 2015 he represented District 30 in the Maryland General Assembly located within Anne Arundel County. He shared this district with Democratic member House Speaker Michael E. Busch and Republican Herbert H. McMillan. Redistricting after 2010 placed George in District 33. He sought the Republican nomination for Governor of Maryland in 2014, but finished fourth in the primary. In December 2014, George expressed interest in being appointed to the District 33 House of Delegates seat vacated by Cathy Vitale, who was appointed a judge. George unsuccessfully ran in 2018 for the state Senate in District 30, which includes Annapolis.

George has been a successful Maryland business owner for over 20 years. He owns Ron George Jewelers located in Annapolis and formerly in Severna Park.

Biography
Born in Syracuse, New York, August 30, 1953. Master goldsmith certificate, jewelry design and repair, Bowman Technical School for Jewelry Making and Design, Lancaster, Pennsylvania, 1972. Syracuse University, B.A. (visual & performing arts), 1978. Institute for Psychological Sciences, M.S. (clinical), 2005. Jeweler. Owner, Ron George Jewelry & Repair, 1987–91; Ron George Jewelers, Inc., 1991–present; State House Inn, 2002–07. Volunteer counselor, Covenant House (emergency youth shelter), New York, 1979–81. Volunteer Director, Conquest Boys Club, 1996–2002. National Board member, Traditions of Roman Catholic Homes (home-schooling support organization), 1998-. Volunteer Executive Director, Springhill Center for Family Development, 2002–08. Member, Annapolis Business Association; Maryland Chamber of Commerce; National Federation of Independent Businesses. Ronald Reagan Award, Annapolis Republican Central Committee, 2005. Legislator of the Year, Annapolis/Anne Arundel Chamber of Commerce, 2008. Distinguished Service Award, Republican Women of Anne Arundel County, 2009. Former Sunday School teacher, St. Mary's Catholic Church, Annapolis. Married; six children, two grandchildren.

As a delegate in the Maryland House of Delegates, George served on the Ways and Means Committee, the Transportation, Education, and Election Law subcommittees, the Sportsmans Caucus, and the Veterans Caucus.  George founded Maryland's Doctors Caucus and advisory board.

Gubernatorial campaign

Delegate George announced his candidacy for Governor of Maryland on June 5, 2013. During his announcement speech, George unveiled his 10 Point Promise. The Promise calls for building the tax base in Baltimore City, creating safe school zones in Baltimore modeled after the Harlem Children's Zone, conducting independent audits of all state agencies, and lowering corporate and unemployment taxes among other initiatives. This plan prompted the Baltimore Sun Editorial Board on July 17, 2013, to name George "The leader so far in providing a specific platform". George finished last in the primary, behind Larry Hogan, who won the nomination, David Craig, and Charles Lollar.

Legislative record
 Voted against in-state tuition for illegal immigrants in 2007 (HB6)
 Sponsored Wind Energy at Greenbury Point in 2010 (HJ7)
 Sponsored Lawful Presence Requirement for Maryland Drivers Licenses (HB195)
 Sponsored Voltage Regulation Technology - Income Tax Subtraction Modification (HB320)
 Sponsored Local Correctional Facilities - New Construction - Residential Programs for Substance Abuse Treatment (HB967)
 Co-Sponsored Intellectual Disability (Rosa's Law) (HB20)
 Co-Sponsored State Property Tax - Homeowner's Property Tax Assessment Cap Reduction (HB156)
 Co-Sponsored 	State Retirement and Pension System - Military Service Credit (HB191)
 Co-Sponsored Silver Alert Program - Establishment (HB317)
 Co-Sponsored Sales and Use Tax - Exemptions - Veterans' Organizations (HB317)
 Co-Sponsored Natural Resources - Oysters - Dredge Devices (ban repealed. Chapter) (HB218)

Election results

2010 Race for Maryland House of Delegates – 30th District
Voters to choose three:
{| class="wikitable"
|-
!Name
!Votes
!Percent
!Outcome
|-
|-
|Ron George, Rep.
|25,631
|  19.25%
|   Won
|-
|-
|Michael E. Busch, Dem.
|23,995
|  18.02%
|   Won
|-
|-
|Herb McMillan, Rep.
|22,553
|  16.94%
|   Won
|-
|-
|Virginia P. Clagett, Dem.
|21,142
|  15.88%
|   Lost
|-
|-
|Seth Howard, Rep.
|20,080
|  15.08%
|   Lost
|-
|-
|Judd Legum, Dem.
|19,670
|  14.77%
|   Lost
|-
|Other Write-Ins
|      89
|    0.07%
|
|-
|}

2014 Republican Gubernatorial Primary Election

{| class="wikitable"
|-
!Name
!Votes
!Percent
!Outcome
|-
|Larry Hogan / Boyd Rutherford
|92,376
|  43.0%
|   Won
|-
|David R. Craig / Jeannie Haddaway
|62,639
|  29.1%
|   Lost
|-
|Charles Lollar / Kenneth R. Timmerman
|33,292
|  15.5%
|   Lost
|-
|Ron George / Shelley Aloi
|26,628
|  12.4%
|   Lost
|}

2018 Race for Maryland Senate – 30th District

{| class="wikitable"
|-
!Name
!Votes
!Percent
!Outcome
|-
|Sarah K. Elfreth, Dem.
|29,736
|  53.8%
|   Won
|-
|Ron George, Rep.
|24,639
|  44.6%
|   Lost
|-
|Christopher Wallace, Sr., Lib.
|     826
|    1.5%
|   Lost
|-
|Other Write-Ins
|       38
|    0.1%
|
|}

Volunteer work

Prior to his jewelry work, George was a volunteer counselor at Covenant House in New York City for two years.  He has also been a volunteer director for the Conquest Boys' Club, volunteering from 1996 until 2002.  He has been working for the Springhill Center for Family Development since 2002 and has been a National Board member of Traditions of Roman Catholic Homes, a home-schooling support organization, since 1998.

Ron George is also a member of the Annapolis Business Association, the Maryland Chamber of Commerce, and the National Federation of Independent Businesses. He received the Ronald Reagan Award from the Annapolis Republican Central Committee in 2005. Additionally, he is a Sunday School teacher for St. Mary's Roman Catholic Church in Annapolis.

Acting career
George is a member of the Screen Actors Guild. He has made appearances in movies such as Chances Are and Broadcast News. He has also appeared in The Doctors, a soap opera, in the late 1970s.

Notes and references

External links
 
 Ron George Campaign website
 Ron George Jewelers website

1953 births
Living people
Republican Party members of the Maryland House of Delegates
People from Columbia, Maryland
Politicians from Syracuse, New York
Syracuse University alumni
People from Anne Arundel County, Maryland
21st-century American politicians